Soldati is an Italian surname. Notable people with the surname include:
Evandro Soldati, Brazilian male model
Franco Soldati, Italian Commercial director
Kimiko Soldati (born 1974), American diver
Mario Soldati, Italian writer and film director
Santiago Soldati, Argentine businessman

See also
Villa Soldati, a neighbourhood in Buenos Aires, Argentina, located in the South-West of the city
Soldati class destroyer, a group of destroyers built for the Italian Navy during World War II
Soldati class patrol frigate, Lupo-class frigates ordered by Iraq in 1980 as part of a naval expansion program just before the Iran–Iraq War

Italian-language surnames